Jacques Bloch-Morhange (31 January 1921 – 15 August 1989) was a French economist and author. In 1970, he revived the Ligue des contribuables, arguing for the repeal of the income tax in France.

Works

References

1921 births
1989 deaths
French economists
French tax resisters
Writers from Paris